In the Days of Struggle is a 1920 Russian silent film directed by Ivane Perestiani. Lost film.

Cast
 Andrei Gorchilin 
 Vsevolod Pudovkin 
 Nina Shaternikova 
 Feofan Shipulinsky

References

Bibliography 
 Sargeant, Amy. Vsevolod Pudovkin: Classic Films of the Soviet Avant-garde. I.B.Tauris, 2001.

External links 
 

1920 films
Russian silent films
1920s Russian-language films
Films directed by Ivan Perestiani
Lost Russian films
Russian black-and-white films
1920 lost films